The Everett Giants were a minor league baseball team based in Everett, Washington, north of Seattle. The Giants were members of the Class A-Short Season Northwest League from 1984 through 1994 and were an affiliate of the San Francisco Giants.

History
Following the 1983 season, Bob and Margaret Bavasi purchased the struggling Walla Walla-based Blue Mountain Bears, previously the Walla Walla Padres. Antiquated facilities, compounded by dwindling attendance in Walla Walla, prompted the new owners to move the franchise. The Bavasis, who had secured affiliation with the San Francisco Giants, ultimately selected Everett as the relocation destination.

In their inaugural campaign, Everett went 36–38. The Giants, in their sophomore season, finished the year at 40–34 to claim the Washington division title, and defeated the Eugene Emeralds in a one-game playoff to claim the Northwest League championship. Rounding out the honors of 1985, owner Bob Bavasi was awarded the league's executive of the year. Two years later the Giants won their second division title, and faced East division champion Spokane Indians in the best-of-three championship series. Everett won the opener at home, but dropped the next two in Spokane. The Giants sought to build upon their success, and posted a 42−34 record in 1988. Everett tied Spokane atop the North division standings, but under league tie-breaker rules, the Indians were declared division winners. The teams split their ten-game series, but the run total in those games was 66 to 65 in Spokane's favor.

Entering the new decade, the Giants struggled on the field. The club continued their affiliation with San Francisco through the 1994 season, then signed a player development contract with the Seattle Mariners. The Mariners, who had been affiliated with Bellingham, essentially swapped with San Francisco as the Giants signed on with Bellingham. Upon affiliating with Seattle, the franchise selected a new team name; the Everett AquaSox.

Season-by-season record

References

External links
Stats Crew Everett Giants

Defunct Northwest League teams
San Francisco Giants minor league affiliates